The 1988 VFL season was the West Coast Eagles' second season in the Victorian Football League (VFL). John Todd was appointed coach after Ron Alexander was sacked and Ross Glendinning remained captain. The Eagles played 22 games, winning 11 and losing 11 to finish 8th on the ladder.

List

Recruitment
West Coast recruited 12 players, with 11 from WAFL clubs, for the 1988 season:
Clinton Browning (East Fremantle)
Kevin Caton (Swan Districts)
Joe Cormack (Swan Districts)
Shane Ellis (East Fremantle)
Richard Geary (South Fremantle)
Peter Higgins (Claremont)
Brent Hutton (Swan Districts)
Don Langsford (Swan Districts)
Guy McKenna (Claremont)
Murray Rance
Troy Ugle (Swan Districts)
Chris Waterman (East Fremantle)

Squad

Pre-season

Panasonic Cup

Home team's score listed in bold:

Regular season
Home team's score listed in bold:

Source: AFLTables

Ladder

References

External links
West Coast Eagles Official Site
Official Site of the Australian Football League

West Coast Eagles
West Coast Eagles seasons